"Say Goodbye" is a song by British pop music group S Club, released as a single from the compilation Best: The Greatest Hits of S Club 7. The final single released before the band's split, it was released on 26 May 2003 as a double A-side with "Love Ain't Gonna Wait for You" in the United Kingdom and Australia; in other territories, it was issued alone.

Music video
The music video showed the group packing up their things into boxes as if they were moving house. While doing this, they look at photographs taken during their performances, photoshoots, as well as other events the band had experienced. When everything is packed up, they look at their past music videos on a sofa before finally gathering together in an empty room to say goodbyes for a final time. At the same time it shows all the rooms empty and when it shows the living room they're in, we find the room empty, indicating they have left.

Track listings
 UK CD1 and Australasian CD single
 "Say Goodbye"
 "Love Ain't Gonna Wait for You" (single remix)
 "Special Kind of Something"
 "Say Goodbye" (video)
 Goodbye messages from Rachel, Tina and Bradley (video)

 UK CD2
 "Say Goodbye"
 "Bitter Sweet"
 "Love Ain't Gonna Wait for You" (video)
 Goodbye messages from Jon, Jo and Hannah (video)

 UK cassette single
 "Say Goodbye"
 "Love Ain't Gonna Wait for You" (Illicit vocal mix)

 European CD single
 "Say Goodbye"
 "Love Ain't Gonna Wait for You" (radio version)

Credits and personnel
Credits are lifted from the UK CD1 liner notes.

Studios
 Engineered and mixed at The Aquarium (London, England)
 Mastered at Transfermation (London, England)

Personnel

 Cathy Dennis – writing
 Chris Braide – writing
 John Themis – guitar
 Stephen Lipson – all other instruments, programming, production
 Nick Ingman – string arrangement, conducting
 Gavyn Wright – concertmaster
 Isobel Griffiths Ltd. – orchestra contracting
 James McMillan – programming
 Heff Moraes – mixing, engineering
 Richard Dowling – mastering

Charts

Weekly charts

Year-end charts

Release history

References

S Club 7 songs
19 Recordings singles
2003 singles
2003 songs
Number-one singles in Scotland
Polydor Records singles
Song recordings produced by Stephen Lipson
Songs written by Cathy Dennis
Songs written by Chris Braide